This is a list of the first women lawyer(s) and judge(s) in Louisiana. It includes the year in which the women were admitted to practice law (in parentheses). Also included are women who achieved other distinctions such becoming the first in their state to graduate from law school or become a political figure.

Firsts in state history

Lawyers 

Bettie Runnels (1898): First female lawyer in Louisiana 
 Marian Berkett (1937): First female lawyer hired by a law firm in Louisiana
Mary Gloria Lawson (1956): First African American female lawyer in Louisiana

State judges 

Anna Judge Veters Levy (c. 1922): First female judge in Louisiana (1941)
Alwine Louise Smith Ragland (1935): First female elected judge (1974)
 Joan Armstrong (1967): First African American female judge in Louisiana (1974) and serve on the Louisiana Court of Appeals (1984)
Catherine D. Kimball (1970): First female elected to the Eighteenth Judicial District Court  (1983) and serve on the Supreme Court of Louisiana (1992)
Rae Swent: First female to serve on the Ninth Judicial District Court in Louisiana
 Ann B. McIntyre (1977): First female to serve on the Fifth Judicial District Court in Louisiana
 Felicia Toney Williams: First female (and African American female) elected to the Louisiana Second Circuit Court of Appeal (1992) and serve as its Chief Judge (2018)
 Bernette Joshua Johnson (1969): First African American female to serve as the Associate Justice (1994-2013) and Chief Justice for the Supreme Court of Louisiana (2013)
Patricia Minaldi (1983): First female elected as the Judge for the Fourteenth Judicial District Court in Louisiana (1995)
Patricia Hedges: First female appointed as a Judge of the Twenty-Second Judicial District Court in Louisiana (1995)
Lori Landry: First African American female appointed as a Judge of the Sixteenth Judicial District in Louisiana (2002)
Jane Margaret Triche-Milazzo: First female appointed as a Judge of the Twenty-Third Judicial District in Louisiana (2008)
 Monique F. Rauls (1993): First African American female appointed as a Judge of the Ninth District Court in Louisiana (2015)
Amy Burford-McCartney: First female judge elected in the Forty-Second Judicial District in Louisiana (2016)
Marissa Hutabarat (2010): First Indonesian American (female) judge in Louisiana (2020)
Marla M. Abel: First female judge elected in the Seventeenth Judicial District in Louisiana (2019)

Federal judges 
Veronica DiCarlo Wicker: First (Italian American) female to serve as a United States District Judge for the Eastern District of Louisiana (1979)
Nannette Jolivette Brown (1988): First African American female to serve on the U.S. District Court for the Eastern District of Louisiana (2011)
Shelly Deckert Dick (1988): First female to serve on the U.S. District Court for the Middle District of Louisiana (2013)

Assistant Attorney General 

 Constance A. Koury (1980): First female Assistant Attorney General of Louisiana (1997)

United States Attorney 

 Stephanie A. Finley: First female to serve as a U.S. Attorney in Louisiana (2010)

District Attorneys 

 Keva Landrum-Johnson: First female (and African American female) to serve as a District Attorney in Louisiana (2007) 
 Bridget A. Dinvaut: First African American female elected as a District Attorney in Louisiana (2015)

Assistant District Attorney 

 Lori Landry: First African American female to serve as an Assistant District Attorney for the Sixteenth Judicial District in Louisiana (c. 1993)

Bar Association 

 Marta-Ann Schnabel: First female to serve as the President of the Louisiana State Bar Association
Kim M. Boyle: First African American female to serve as the President of the Louisiana State Bar Association (2009-2010)

Firsts in local history 
 Jane Margaret Triche-Milazzo: First female appointed as a Judge of the Twenty-Third Judicial District in Louisiana (2008) [Ascension, Assumption, and St. James Parishes, Louisiana]
 Carrie Keller (c. 1915): First female lawyer in Shreveport, Louisiana [Bossier and Caddo Parishes, Louisiana]
 Alwine Louise Smith Ragland (1935): First female to become a Judge of the Sixth Judicial District in Louisiana (1974) [East Carroll, Madison, and Tensas Parishes, Louisiana]
 Ann B. McIntyre (1977): First female lawyer in Franklin Parish, Louisiana (specifically Winnsboro, Louisiana) and Judge of the Fifth Judicial District in Louisiana [Franklin, Richland and West Carroll Parishes, Louisiana]
 Catherine D. Kimball (1970): First female elected as a Judge of the Eighteenth Judicial District Court (1983) [Iberville, Pointe Coupee, and West Baton Rouge Parishes, Louisiana]
 Patricia Hedges: First female appointed as a Judge of the Twenty-Second Judicial District Court in Louisiana (1995) [St. Tammany and Washington Parishes, Louisiana]
 Donna Y. Frazier: First female Caddo Parish attorney (equivalent to a County Attorney) in Shreveport, Louisiana (2013)
 Amy Burford-McCartney: First female judge elected in the Forty-Second Judicial District in Louisiana (2016) [DeSoto Parish, Louisiana]
 Jo Ellen Grant and Martha E. Sassone: First female judges respectively in Jefferson Parish, Louisiana
June Berry Darensburg: First African American female elected to a judgeship in Jefferson Parish, Louisiana (2006)
Diana Simon: First female litigator in Lafayette, Louisiana [Lafayette Parish, Louisiana] 
Vanessa Harris: First African American (female) to serve as a Judge of the Lafayette City Court (2021) [Lafayette Parish, Louisiana]
Kristine Russell: First female District Attorney for the Lafourche Parish, Louisiana (2018)
Marla Abel: First female judge in Lafourche Parish, Louisiana (upon her appointment as a Judge of the 17th Judicial District Court in 2020)
Bernette Joshua Johnson (1969): First female (and African American female) to serve as a Judge of the Orleans Parish Civil District Court (1984) and its Chief Judge (1994)
Angelique Reed: First African American (female) to serve as a Judge of New Orleans' First City Civil District Court (1998) and its Senior Judge
Miriam Waltzer: First female judge to be elected to Orleans Parish Criminal District Court, Louisiana
Kim M. Boyle: First African American female (and African American overall) to serve as the President of the New Orleans Bar Association (2003)
Keva Landrum-Johnson: First female District Attorney for the Orleans Parish, Louisiana (2007)
Marissa Hutabarat (2010): First Indonesian American (female) to serve as Judge of the First City Court in New Orleans, Louisiana (2020)
Monique F. Rauls (1993): First African American female judge in Rapides Parish, Louisiana
Rae Swent: First female appointed as a Judge of the Ninth Judicial District in Louisiana [Rapides Parish, Louisiana]
Jeanne Juneau: First female judge in St. Bernard Parish, Louisiana (2013)
Bridget A. Dinvaut: First African American female elected as the District Attorney for St. John the Baptist Parish, Louisiana (2015)
Vanessa Harris: First (African American) female to serve as a Judge of the Opelousas City Court (2009) [St. Landry Parish, Louisiana]
Dixie Brown: First female prosecutor in Terrebonne Parish, Louisiana (1979)

See also  

 List of first women lawyers and judges in the United States
 Timeline of women lawyers in the United States
 Women in law

Other topics of interest 

 List of first minority male lawyers and judges in the United States
 List of first minority male lawyers and judges in Louisiana

References 

Lawyers, Louisiana, first
Louisiana, first
Women, Louisiana, first
Women, Louisiana, first
Women in Louisiana
Lists of people from Louisiana
Louisiana lawyers